The 2017 Budapest GP3 Series round was the fourth round of the 2017 GP3 Series. It was held on 29 and 30 July 2017 at Hungaroring in Mogyoród, Hungary. The race supported the 2017 Hungarian Grand Prix.

Classification

Qualifying

Feature Race

Sprint Race

Championship standings after the round

Drivers' Championship standings

Teams' Championship standings

 Note: Only the top five positions are included for both sets of standings.

Notes

References

|- style="text-align:center"
|width="35%"|Previous race:
|width="30%"|GP3 Series2017 season
|width="40%"|Next race:

Budapest
Budapest GP3
Budapest GP3